Automatic is an album by Dweezil Zappa, released in 2000. "Purple Guitar" was the audition piece for Bryan Beller to work with Zappa on this album. The song "Secret Hedges" was featured on Adult Swim.

Track listing
All songs written by Dweezil Zappa except where noted.

 "Fwakstension" performed by Zappa / Terry Bozzio / Scott Thunes – 4:13
 "Automatic" performed by Zappa / Blues Saraceno / Joe Travers / Christopher Maloney – 3:59
 "Hawaii Five-O" (Morton Stevens) performed by Zappa / Joe Travers – 1:52
 "You're a Mean One Mister Grinch" (Dr. Seuss & Albert Hague) performed by Zappa / Ahmet Zappa / Joe Travers – 3:12
 "Therapy" performed by Zappa / Terry Bozzio / Scott Thunes – 2:59
 "12 String Thing" performed by Zappa / Joe Travers / Mark Meadows – 2:46
 "Secret Hedges" (Zappa) – 2:12
 "Habanera" (from the opera Carmen by Georges Bizet) performed by Zappa / Dick Cinnamon – 1:54
 "Les Toreadors" (from the opera Carmen by Georges Bizet) performed by Zappa / Dick Cinnamon – 2:35
 "Shnook" performed by Zappa / Scott Thunes / Mike Keneally – 2:55
 "Dick Cinnamon's Office" performed by Zappa / Lisa Loeb / Joe Travers / Christopher Maloney - :55
 "Purple Guitar" performed by Zappa / Joe Travers / Mike Keneally – 9:18

Personnel
 Dweezil Zappa - lead electric and acoustic guitars, lead and harmony vocals, flange bass, bass, electric piano, arrangements, guitar arrangements, production, engineering, feedback, harmony
 Blues Saraceno - guitars
 Lisa Loeb - voices
 Morgan Ågren - drums, percussion
 Bryan Beller - bass, performer
 Terry Bozzio - drums
 Christopher Maloney - bass
 Bob Clearmountain - mixing
 Mike Keneally - rhythm guitar, backing vocals
 Scott Thunes - bass
 Joe Travers - drums, percussion
 Ahmet Zappa - vocals
 Steve Hall - mastering
 Jason Freese - performer

References

Dweezil Zappa albums
Favored Nations albums
2000 albums